Honvéd or Honved may refer to:

Hungarian Army
 Royal Hungarian Landwehr (1867-1918)
 Royal Hungarian Army (1920-1945)
 Hungarian Defence Force (1946-present)

Hungarian sports teams
 Budapest Honvéd FC, a Hungarian football team
 Budapesti Honvéd SE (athletics)
 Budapesti Honvéd SE (canoeing)
 Budapesti Honvéd SE (fencing)
 Budapesti Honvéd SE (men's water polo), a Hungarian water polo team
 Budapesti Honvéd SE (men's basketball), a Hungarian basketball team
 Budapesti Honvéd SE (swimming)
 Szegedi Honvéd SE, a Hungarian association football club from Szeged